When a work's copyright expires, it enters the public domain. The following is a list of works that entered the public domain in 2016. Since laws vary globally, the copyright status of some works are not uniform.

Authors entering the public domain

Authors entering the public domain 70 years after death
With the exception of Belarus and Spain, a work enters the public domain in Europe and Brazil 70 years after the creator's death, if it was published during the creator's lifetime. The list is sorted alphabetically and includes a notable work of the creator that entered the public domain on January 1, 2016.

Entering the public domain in the United States

The Copyright Term Extension Act means no published works would enter the public domain in this jurisdiction until 2019. Only unpublished works whose authors died in 1945 enter the public domain.

Works entering in public domain in 2016 by media

Books

 A Voyage to Arcturus by David Lindsay
 Sidney, Philip and His Wife, The Awakening of Helena Richie, The Iron Woman, The Rising Tide by Margaret Deland.
 Paulicéia Desvairada, Macunaíma by Mário de Andrade
 Aşk-ı Memnu, Kırık Hayatlar by Halid Ziya Uşaklıgil
 Bambi, a Life in the Woods, Bambi's Children, Josephine Mutzenbacher, The Hound of Florence, Fünf Minuten Amerika, Perri by Felix Salten.
 Red Plague Poem by Józef Szczepański
 Journey by Moonlight by Antal Szerb
 The Diary of a Young Girl by Anne Frank
 A Child of the Jago by Arthur Morrison
 Collection of Poems. 1889–1903 and Collection of Poems. Book 2. 1903-1909 by Zinaida Gippius
 Mein Kampf by Adolf Hitler
 Sister Carrie, Jennie Gerhardt, The Financier, The Titan, The "Genius", An American Tragedy, Chains: Lesser Novels and Stories, The Bulwark, The Stoic by Theodore Dreiser.
 ''The Worm Ouroboros by E. R. Eddison

Images

 Winter by Vilhelms Purvītis

Music

 Six string quartets and Cantata Profana by Béla Bartók.
 Variations for piano, op. 27, String Quartet, Op. 28, Concerto for Nine Instruments, Op. 24 by Anton Webern.
 Prelude in E minor, BWV 855a by Alexander Siloti
 Music of Le Pavillon d'Armide Ballet by Nikolai Tcherepnin
 You Made Me Love You (I Didn't Want to Do It) by James V. Monaco and Joseph McCarthy.

See also 
 2012 in public domain
 2013 in public domain
 2014 in public domain
 2015 in public domain
 2017 in public domain
 2018 in public domain
 2019 in public domain
 2020 in public domain
 2021 in public domain
 2022 in public domain
 List of countries' copyright lengths
 Public Domain Day
 Creative Commons
 Public Domain
 Over 300 public domain authors available in Wikisource (any language), with descriptions from Wikidata
 1945 in literature, 1955 in literature, 1965 in literature and 1975 in literature

References

Public domain
Public domain